Total Anarchy is a 2006 album released by Israeli psychedelic trance artist Asher Swissa of Skazi.

Track listing
 "Vampire"
 "Anarchy"
 "Hit 'N' Run"
 "Madness"
 "Move Away"
 "Bang Your Mind"
 "Outer Space"
 "Rock & Roll"
 "K.O."
 "Fucking My Brain"

2006 albums
Skazi albums